Spurius Maelius (died 439 BC) was a wealthy Roman plebeian who was slain because he was suspected of intending to make himself king.

Biography
During a severe famine, Spurius Maelius bought up a large amount of wheat and sold it at a low price to the people of Rome. According to Livy, this caused Lucius Minucius Augurinus, the patrician praefectus annonae (president of the market), to accuse Spurius Maelius of collecting arms in his house, and that he was holding secret meetings at which plans were being undoubtedly formed to establish a monarchy. The accusation was widely believed. Maelius was summoned before the aged Cincinnatus (specially appointed dictator), but he refused to appear, and was slain by the Master of the Horse, Gaius Servilius Ahala. Afterward his house was razed to the ground, his wheat distributed amongst the people, and his property confiscated. The open space called the Equimaelium, on which his house had stood, preserved the memory of his death along the Vicus Jugarius. Cicero calls Ahala's deed a glorious one, but, whether Maelius entertained any ambitious projects or not, his summary execution was an act of murder, since by the Lex Valeria Horatia de provocatione the dictator was bound to allow the right of appeal.

See also
 Marcus Junius Brutus

References

Attribution
 Endnotes:

Sources
Niebuhr's History of Rome, ii. 418 (Eng. trans., 1851);
G. Cornewall Lewis, Credibility of early Roman History, ii.;
Livy, iv. 13;
Ancient sources: Livy, iv.13; Cicero, De senectute 16, De amicitia 8, De republica, ii.49; Florus, i.26; Dionysius Halicarnassensis xii.I.

439 BC deaths
Ancient Roman murder victims
5th-century BC Romans
Maelii
Year of birth missing